Isaac Mahmood Noell (born 12 April 1983), known professionally as Sak Noel, is a Spanish DJ, record producer, songwriter and music video director. He is best known for the international hits "Loca People", "Paso", "No Boyfriend (No Problem)" with Mayra Verónica which debuted at number 40 on the Billboard Dance/Mix Show Airplay chart, and "Trumpets" with Salvi and Sean Paul.

Discography

Singles

Remixes and other versions
 "Esta Es Mi Fiesta" (Sak Noel Remix) — Xana
 "Paso (The Nini Anthem)" (Remix) (with Sito Rocks)
 "Loca People" (Remix) (with Pitbull and Sensato)
 "Literally I Can't" (Remix) (with Redfoo)
 "Pierdo La Cabeza" (Remix) (with Zion & Lennox)
 "Bajo El Mismo Sol" (Remix) (with Jennifer Lopez and Alvaro Soler)
 "Gimme Gimme" (Remix) (with Inna)
 "Cold" (Sak Noel Remix) — Maroon 5
"Further Up (Na, Na, Na, Na, Na)" (Sak Noel Remix) — Static & Ben El featuring Pitbull

References

External links
 Sak Noel official website

Spanish dance musicians
Spanish DJs
Living people
People from Selva
1983 births
Mad Decent artists